was a town located in Tōda District, Miyagi Prefecture, Japan.

In 2003, the town had an estimated population of 6,887 and a population density of 174.27 persons per km². The total area was 39.52 km².

Dissolved municipalities of Miyagi Prefecture
Misato, Miyagi